|}

The Futurity Stakes is a Group 2 flat horse race in Ireland open to two-year-old thoroughbreds. It is run at the Curragh over a distance of 7 furlongs (1,408 metres), and it is scheduled to take place each year in August.

History
The event was previously known as the Ashford Castle Stakes and the Stayers Plate. It was originally contested over 7 furlongs, but it was extended to a mile in 1969. For a period it was classed at Group 3 level.

The race's current spell over 7 furlongs began in 1997. It was promoted to Group 2 status in 2001. The Futurity Stakes is now sponsored by Coolmore Stud, and its full title includes the name of Galileo, a Coolmore stallion.

Records
Leading jockey since 1950 (7 wins):
 Michael Kinane – Without Reserve (1983), Phantom Breeze (1988), Teach Dha Mhile (1989), Giant's Causeway (1999), Hawk Wing (2001), Van Nistelrooy (2002), Arazan (2008)

Leading trainer since 1950 (16 wins):
 Vincent O'Brien – Chamier (1952), Baljour (1964), Great Life (1969), Tantoul (1970), Seaford (1972), Sir Penfro (1973), I've a Bee (1975), Padroug (1976), Octavo (1977), Accomplice (1978), Monteverdi (1979), Benefice (1980), Danzatore (1982), Sunstart (1984), Woodman (1985), Fatherland (1992)

Winners since 1980

Earlier winners

 1950: Sea Prince
 1951: Coolabah
 1952: Chamier
 1953: Kingsley
 1954: Katushev
 1955: Clelie
 1956: Martini
 1957: Paddy's Point
 1958: Dusky Boy
 1959: Say Less
 1960: Carsage
 1961: Sicilian Prince
 1962: Quick Freeze
 1963: Californian
 1964: Baljour
 1965: Bellis
 1966: Zaracarn
 1967: French Serenade
 1968: Santamoss
 1969: Great Life
 1970: Tantoul
 1971: i) Bog Road, ii) Flair Path *
 1972: Seaford
 1973: Sir Penfro
 1974: Small World
 1975: I've a Bee
 1976: Padroug
 1977: Octavo
 1978: Accomplice
 1979: Monteverdi

* The race was run in two separate divisions in 1971.

See also
 Horse racing in Ireland
 List of Irish flat horse races

References
 Racing Post:

 galopp-sieger.de – Futurity Stakes.
 ifhaonline.org – International Federation of Horseracing Authorities – Futurity Stakes (2019).
 irishracinggreats.com – Futurity Stakes (Group 2).
 pedigreequery.com – Futurity Stakes – Curragh.

Flat races in Ireland
Curragh Racecourse
Flat horse races for two-year-olds